The 2006 Betfred Premier League was a professional non-ranking snooker tournament that was played from 14 September to 3 December 2006.

Ronnie O'Sullivan won in the final 7–0 against Jimmy White.


Prize fund 
The breakdown of prize money for this year is shown below:
Winner: £50,000
Runner-up: £25,000
Semi-final: £12,500
Frame-win: £1,000
Century break: £1,000
Total: £250,000

League phase

Top four qualified for the play-offs. If points were level then most frames won determined their positions. If two players had an identical record then the result in their match determined their positions. If that ended 3–3 then the player who got to three first was higher. (Breaks above 50 shown between (parentheses), century breaks are indicated with bold.)

 14 September – Sands Centre, Carlisle, England
 Ronnie O'Sullivan 3–3 Ding Junhui → 8–79, (98)–4, (65)–(69), 0–(76), 86–16, (86)–0
 Graeme Dott 3–3 Stephen Hendry → 58–(59), (75)–15, 76–69 (53), (57) 74–21, 21–64, 50–63
 21 September – GL1, Gloucester, England
  Jimmy White 2–4 Graeme Dott → (75) 80–0, 36–93, 34–(67), 64–55, 1–102 (96), 32–65 (61)
  Ronnie O'Sullivan 5–1 Ken Doherty → 69–9, (66) 78–28, (71) 75–0, (124)–6, (61) 87–0, 9–65
 28 September – The Hawth, Crawley, England
 Steve Davis 0–6 Ding Junhui → 46–55, 29–78, 53–(57), 12–55, 39–54, 41–59
 Jimmy White 2–4 Ken Doherty → 0–68, 53–1, 1–92 (55), 15–44, 0–70 (51), 72–22
 5 October – Assembly Rooms, Derby, England
 Jimmy White 5–1 Ding Junhui → 65–36, 0–63, (51) 71–23, 55–9, 53–51, (63) 67–1
 Stephen Hendry 1–5 Steve Davis → 45–56, 26–91 (79), 0–(75), 9–67, 63–66, (71) 72–24
 12 October – Guild Hall, Preston, England
 Ken Doherty 2–4 Ding Junhui → (84) 88–0, 0–80, 0–(73), 61–41, 4–67 (54), 4–(112)
 Ronnie O'Sullivan 5–1 Jimmy White → (54) 77–45, 35–69, (73) 114–0, (68) 80–16, 53–21, (51) 88–21
 19 October – Grimsby Auditorium, Grimsby, England
 Stephen Hendry 4–2 Ken Doherty → (60) 84–0, 70–7, 84–27, 1–80, (74) 81–0, 9–103
 Steve Davis 3–3 Jimmy White → 41–78 (55), 71–24, 16–87, 52–62, 59–52, 67–40
 2 November – Plymouth Pavilions, Plymouth, England
 Ronnie O'Sullivan 4–2 Steve Davis → (88)–5, 72–48, 7–30, 82–5, 8–68, (108)–0
 Graeme Dott 2–4 Ding Junhui → 0–126 (71,55), 7–64, 42–(79), (107) 131–0, 12–93 (81), 68–63 (56)
 9 November – Warwick Arts Centre, Coventry, England
 Ken Doherty 4–2 Graeme Dott → 81–15, (65) 78–13, 59–44, 0–90 (68), 0–95 (88), (83)–0
 Stephen Hendry 1–5 Jimmy White → 51–48, 0–122 (105), 26–76 (75), 0–71, 45–49, 30–76
 16 November – SECC, Glasgow, Scotland
 Graeme Dott 4–2 Steve Davis → (61) 73–44, 1–81 (57), 0–(101), (70) 90–40, (70)82–27, 76–5
 Ronnie O'Sullivan 4–2 Stephen Hendry → (65) 82–7, 51–35, 68–3, 0–(87), 4–78 (72), (84)–5
 23 November – AECC, Aberdeen, Scotland
 Steve Davis 5–1 Ken Doherty →  (114) 139–7, 15–73 (69), (89) 90–4, 93–5, 93–24, (59) 78–6
 Stephen Hendry 3–3 Ding Junhui → 57–43, (101)–7, 9–113 (108), (78)–12, 9–121(120), 12–(82)
 Ronnie O'Sullivan 3–3 Graeme Dott → 47–91, 1–86 (79), 16–103 (67), 84–8, (88) 91–10, (64) 79–50

Play-offs 
2–3 December – Forum Centre, Wythenshawe, England

* (111)–18, (54) 100–16, (64) 74–1, 48–66, (86) 106–17, 28–64, (64) 71–14
** 50–67, 0–71 (64), 0–(94), 20–62, (87)–1, (51) 63–28, 57–9, (61) 90–16, 11–60
*** 77–7, 62–49, (122)–0, (93)–0, 46–13, (73) 98–1, (113)–9

Century breaks

 124, 122, 113, 111, 108  Ronnie O'Sullivan
 120, 112, 108  Ding Junhui
 114, 101  Steve Davis
 107  Graeme Dott
 105  Jimmy White
 101  Stephen Hendry

Notes

References

2006
Premier League
Premier League Snooker